Ural Murtazovich Rakhimov (Räximov Ural Mortaza ulı; born 13 December 1961) is a Russian businessman of Bashkir ethnicity. Rakhimov is the 191st richest man in Russia with a net worth of US$500 million as of 2011.

Biography
Rakhimov was born in Ufa. Worldwide, Rakhimov is known to be the only son of Murtaza Rakhimov, the former president of Bashkortostan. Throughout most of Rakhimov's life, he maintained a deep interest in science, eventually studying at Ufa State Petroleum Technological University and graduating in 1984.

He then studied at the French Petroleum Institute, receiving a Master's of Science, and then he studied in the United States for another Master's degree. For most of his business career, he was a member of Bashneft. In 2003, he initiated the creation of Bashkir capital. During 2009 till early 2010, he was the owner of Salavat Yulaev Ufa.

References

1961 births
Living people
People from Ufa
Bashkir people
Russian businesspeople in the oil industry
20th-century Russian businesspeople
21st-century Russian businesspeople